Xavier James (born 28 December 1975) is a sprinter who represented Bermuda at the 2004 Summer Olympics. He is currently a primary school teacher.

References

External links 

Bermudian male sprinters
Athletes (track and field) at the 2004 Summer Olympics
Olympic athletes of Bermuda
Athletes (track and field) at the 2002 Commonwealth Games
Commonwealth Games competitors for Bermuda
1975 births
Living people
Place of birth missing (living people)